Daniel Bonham (born June 3, 1977) is a Republican member of the Oregon State Senate. He represents the 26th district, encompassing rural Clackamas County and parts of Wasco, Hood River, and east Multnomah Counties making up the Columbia River Gorge.

Biography
Bonham was raised in Tigard, Oregon, and graduated from Tigard High School in 1995. He received a bachelor's degree in business from Linfield College in 1999. Bonham then worked for Evergreen International Aviation and RB Rubber Products in McMinnville, before moving to The Dalles in 2007, where he purchased Maupin's Stove and Spas.

After Representative John Huffman resigned, Bonham was appointed by county commissioners to fill the vacancy.

Political experience in city government 
Daniel Bonham has been actively involved in local politics in The Dalles. He was previously on The Dalles City Budget Committee as well as The Dalles Urban Renewal Budget Committee where he worked with other community experts and leaders.

Positions held in the Oregon State Legislature

The 2018 session 
He held the position of Vice-Chair on the House Committee of Early Child Development and Family Supports. He was a member of the House Transportation committee and House
Energy & Environment Committee. He was also involved in the Paid Family & Medical Leave Workgroup, and Chair Rural Policy Workgroup. Daniel Bonham also held a position in the Legislative Council on River Governance.

The 2019 session 
Daniel Bonham currently holds the position of Vice-Chair for the House Committee on Economic Development. He is also a member for the House Committee on Business and Labor. Daniel Bonham is also a member on Joint Committees on Carbon Reduction and Ways and Means Subcommittee on General Government.

The 2020 session 
Bonham was one of the Republicans that walked out of the Oregon State Capitol to boycott Senate Bill 1530. The walkout resulted in 255 bills being abandoned.

Political positions

Abortion 
Regarding abortion, Bonham describes himself as "a right-to-life person" but "a man who believes in the rule of law." He opposes publicly funded health care.

Business and economy 

Daniel Bonham supports broadening the tax base through reduction of taxes and allowing business to grow. Increasing the economy would increase tax revenue which allows the state to investment in the educational system and support reasonable social services.

Education 

Oregon has no greater obligation than to ensure it is providing the resources necessary for a quality education. A stronger education system means greater opportunities for the future of our kids, community, industry, and our state.

Rural issues 

The challenges facing our rural communities are often overlooked in Salem. Daniel was a strong advocate for bringing broadband access to Maupin. He passed legislation that improves the management of our federal forestland, reduced forest fire risk, and provides additional resources to watershed management.

Personal life
Bonham and his wife, Lorilyn, have two children: Jennifer and Jack.

External links 
 Campaign website
 Legislative website

References

1977 births
Living people
21st-century American politicians
Businesspeople from Oregon
Linfield University alumni
Republican Party members of the Oregon House of Representatives
People from McMinnville, Oregon
People from The Dalles, Oregon
Politicians from Tigard, Oregon
People from Novato, California